De Roy is a lunar impact crater that is located on the far side of the Moon, just behind the southwestern limb. This portion of the lunar surface is brought into view during favorable librations, allowing observation of this formation. However the crater is viewed from the side when watched from the Earth, and little detail can be seen. De Roy lies to the west of the crater Arrhenius, and east of the larger Boltzmann.

This crater has a worn and rounded outer rim, forming a slightly irregular circle. A pair of tiny craterlets lie along the southeast rim, and there is a narrow cleft in the northern wall. The interior floor is level and nearly featureless, with only a few tiny crater pits to mark the surface.

This crater lies within the Mendel-Rydberg Basin, a 630 km wide impact basin of Nectarian age.

Satellite craters
By convention these features are identified on lunar maps by placing the letter on the side of the crater midpoint that is closest to De Roy.

The following craters have been renamed by the IAU.
 De Roy X — See Chadwick.

References

 
 
 
 
 
 
 
 
 
 
 
 

Impact craters on the Moon